Many works of fiction have incorporated into their world the existence of beverages or drinksliquids made for popular consumptionwhich may create a sense of the world in which the story takes place, and in some cases may serve to advance the plot of the story. These products may be fictional brands which serve as a stand in for brand names, and in that capacity may be a vessel for mockery of the marketing culture associated with brand name products (e.g., Duff Beer from The Simpsons; Buzz Beer from The Drew Carey Show). In science fiction, beverages from alien races may enhance the sense of a futuristic society (e.g. Romulan Ale in Star Trek).

While there are many fictional liquids that can be consumed, fictional liquid medicines and magical potions (such as the liquid that causes Alice to shrink in Alice in Wonderland) may not be widely available for common consumption, or may simply not be described as being used for that purpose, and thus would not be considered "beverages" at all.

Alcoholic or intoxicating beverages

In literature and print

In film

In television

In radio

In video games

Miscellaneous

Non-alcoholic beverages

In literature and print

In film

In television

In video games

Miscellaneous

Magical/fantasy beverages

In literature and print

Fictional beverages later marketed
Some real-life beverages were created and marketed after appearing as fictional, as is the case with Duff Beer from the TV show The Simpsons. To promote The Simpsons Movie, convenience store 7-Eleven marketed a Duff-branded energy drink.
 Booty SweatTropic Thunder
 BrawndoIdiocracy
 Duff BeerThe Simpsons
 SquisheeThe Simpsons
 SwillSaturday Night Live
 Buzz ColaThe Simpsons
 Romulan Aleat the Star Trek Experience in Las Vegas, NV.
 Romulan Alean energy drink created and marketed by Boston America Corp.
 Klingon Raktajinoalso available previously at the Star Trek Experience.
 SlurmFuturama
 Victory GinIn the late 1980s and early 1990s UK off licence chain Victoria Wine sold an own brand of gin called Victory Gin.  It was not deliberately styled after the unpalatable product in Nineteen Eighty-Four; rather, it was originally called Portsmouth Gin, but this presumably caused confusion with Plymouth Gin. The name was changed to Victory, after Nelson's famous flagship , a tourist attraction in Portsmouth, the marketers presumably unaware of the brand's literary namesake.

See also
 Independent Studio Services, provider of props, including several fictionally branded beverages, to television and movie productions

References

External links

Lists of drinks
Drinks